Claire Goll (born Klara Liliane Aischmann) (29 October 1890 – 30 May 1977) was a German-French writer and journalist; she married the poet Yvan Goll in 1921.

Biography
Goll née Aischmann was born on 29 October 1890 in Nuremberg, Germany. She grew up in Munich.

In 1911 Goll married the publisher Heinrich Studer (1889–1961) and lived with him in Leipzig. In May 1912 she gave birth to their daughter Dorothea Elisabeth, her only child. In 1916 she emigrated in protest of World War I to Switzerland, where she studied at the University of Geneva, became involved in the peace movement, and began to work as a journalist. In 1917 she and Studer divorced, and she met the poet Yvan Goll, to whom she became engaged. At the end 1918, she had an affair with Rainer Maria Rilke and they remained friends until his death. In 1918 she debuted as a writer with the poetry collection  and the novella collection . In 1919, she travelled with Goll to Paris, where they married in 1921. Her short stories, poems, and novels also appeared in French. She wrote her poetry collections  (1925),  (1926) and  together with her husband as a "shared song of love" ("").

The pair, both of Jewish origin, fled from Europe to New York in 1939, but returned in 1947. Yvan died in 1950. From then on, Goll dedicated her work to her husband. However, her battle with Paul Celan over copyright and plagiarism, known as the "Goll Affair", caused a significant stir.

Goll died on 30 May 1977 in Paris, France.

References

External links

 
 
 

German women writers
1890 births
1977 deaths
Writers from Nuremberg
German anti–World War I activists
German anti-war activists
Burials at Père Lachaise Cemetery